Hohe Rhön is a Verwaltungsgemeinschaft ("collective municipality") in the district Schmalkalden-Meiningen, in Thuringia, Germany. The seat of the Verwaltungsgemeinschaft is in Kaltennordheim.

The Verwaltungsgemeinschaft Hohe Rhön consists of the following municipalities:
Birx 
Erbenhausen 
Frankenheim 
Kaltennordheim
Oberweid

References

Verwaltungsgemeinschaften in Thuringia
Rhön Mountains